was a Japanese music, video game, and software publishing company located in Akasaka, Tokyo.  Founded in October 1989 as a music and video packaging firm, it since became a distributor and producer of electronic entertainment.  The company has been involved with several video game developers on a number of systems beginning with the PC Engine in 1990, and was primarily known for their Zero4 Champ racing game series, as well as the Game Boy Advance title Lunar Legend.  The company's name is sometimes incorrectly translated as "Magic Rings" by English websites.  It has been officially dissolved as of April 2007.

Video games

Published
PC Engine
 Spin Pair (1990)
 Spiral Wave (1991)
 Zero4 Champ (1991)
 Toilet Kids (1992)

PC Engine CD
 Tecmo World Cup Super Soccer (1992)
 Zero4 Champ II (1993)

Super Nintendo
 Zero4 Champ RR (1994)
 Ballz (1995)
 Zero4 Champ RR-Z (1995)

Sega Saturn
 Tactical Fighter (1997)
 Zero4 Champ: DooZy-J Type R (1997)

PlayStation
 Suzumepai Yuugi '99: Tanuki no Kawasanyou (1998)
 Yuugen Kaisha Chikyuu Boueitai: Earth Defenders Corporation (1999)
 Mahjong Toriadama Kikou (2000)
 Super Bass Fishing (2000)
 Tantei Jinguuji Saburo: Touka ga Kienu Mani (2000)
 Tantei Jinguuji Saburo: Yume no Owarini (2000)
 Runabout 2 (2000)
 Kowloon Jou (2000)
 Tantei Jinguuji Saburo: Mikan no Report (2000)
 Phat Air: Extreme Snowboarding (2000)
 Superstar Dance Club (2000)
 Tantei Jinguuji Saburo Early Collection (2000)
 Doki Doki Poyatachio!! (Cancelled)

Game Boy Advance
 Mugen Kinogyou Zero Tours (2001)
 Saibara Rieko no Dendou Mahjong (2001)
 Wizardry: The Summoning (2001)

Developed
PC Engine
 Boxyboy (1990)
 Zero4 Champ (1991)

PC Engine CD
 Zero4 Champ II (1993)

Super Nintendo
 Zero-4 Champ RR (1994)

Game Boy Advance
 Lunar Legend (2002)

Animation

Published
 Figures of Happiness (1990–1991)
 Burn Up W (1996)

References

External links
 Official website 

Defunct video game companies of Japan
Video game publishers
Video game companies established in 1989
Video game companies disestablished in 2007
Video game development companies
Japanese companies established in 1989
Japanese companies disestablished in 2007